Rupert Scofield (born 1949) was the Co-Founder of FINCA International and was the organization's President and CEO since 1994. Scofield passed on peacefully, surrounded by his family on November 27, 2022. He was 73.

Education
Scofield had two MAs in Agricultural Economics and Public Administration from the University of Wisconsin and a Bachelor of Arts degree from Brown University.

Professional life
Scofield dodged the Vietnam War draft in 1971 and instead joined the Peace Corps where he assisted farmers in the highlands of Guatemala. It was during this time in his life that Scofield saw how extremely small loans could have an effect on a community.

After leaving the Peace Corps, Scofield worked for the American Institute for Free Labour Development on land reform in El Salvador. Scofield noted that his time in El Salvador was dangerous due to landlords in the country disputing the expropriation of their plantations. This culminated in Scofield's boss being murdered.

In 1984, Scofield co-founded FINCA with John Hatch to provide savings accounts, loans and other financial services to poor and low-income people. FINCA initially focused on lending to women, with Scofield explaining "Women are more honest about repaying loans; they're also more likely to invest profits in their children."

FINCA now has over 2 million clients across five continents and a loan portfolio of $1 billion. Scofield commented that FINCA's work since its inception meant that "There are many people now with access to financial services that didn't have that access before."

Personal life
Scofield hosts The Social Enterprise Podcast, a monthly podcast that explores the challenges of starting, building and running a social enterprise.

His book, The Social Entrepreneur's Handbook: How to Start, Build and Run a Business that Improves the World (McGraw-Hill, 2011), tells the story of how FINCA was built in addition to providing guidance on building social businesses.

Scofield serves as the Chair Emeritus of the Partnership for Responsible Financial Inclusion, a collaborative effort by leaders from ten international organizations that promotes microfinance around the world

References

1949 births
Living people
Businesspeople from New York City
Writers from New York City
Peace Corps volunteers
Brown University alumni
University of Wisconsin–Madison College of Agricultural and Life Sciences alumni
Robert M. La Follette School of Public Affairs alumni